are areas of water in Japan so designated, in accordance with Section 2 of the 1951 , by the Minister of Agriculture, Forestry and Fisheries in conjunction with the prefectural governor in an effort to protect and cultivate the aquatic animals and plants living on and below the surface.

Representative of each type are areas of the Seto Inland and Ariake Seas, Ibi, Kinugawa, Nagara, and Tenryū Rivers, and Lakes Biwa and Kasumigaura, respectively.

In these areas, as well as no-take measures, with the harvesting of all or particular species prohibited, and breeding and propagation initiatives, activities including dredging and land reclamation are restricted and regulated.

See also
 Ministry of Agriculture, Forestry and Fisheries (Japan)
 100 Fishing Village Heritage Sites (Japan)
 Wildlife of Japan: Fish
 Fishing in Japan

References

Protected areas of Japan
Fishing in Japan